The Broadcasting and Entertainment Trades Alliance (BETA) was a short-lived British entertainment trade union.  It was founded in 1984 with the merger of the Association of Broadcasting Staff and the National Association of Theatrical Television and Kine Employees.

The union appointed two General Secretaries, Tony Hearn and John Wilson; Wilson standing down in 1987.

In 1991, BETA merged with the Association of Cinematograph Television and Allied Technicians to form the Broadcasting, Entertainment, Cinematograph and Theatre Union.

References
BECTU History: 1979 Onwards
Catalogue of the BETA BBC archives, held at the Modern Records Centre, University of Warwick

Broadcasting in the United Kingdom
Communications and media organisations based in the United Kingdom
Defunct trade unions of the United Kingdom
Entertainment industry unions
1984 establishments in the United Kingdom
Trade unions based in London
Trade unions established in 1984
Trade unions disestablished in 1991